Abrosoma nebulosum is a species of phasmid or stick insect of the genus Abrosoma. It is found in Sri Lanka.

References

External links
World of Phasmids - A
Designation of type-species of several genera of Phasmatodea: Areolatae

Phasmatodea
Insects of Asia
Insects described in 1859